Darevskia praticola, the meadow lizard,  is a lizard species in the genus Darevskia. It is found in Georgia, Russia, Iran, Serbia, Bulgaria, Romania, Greece, Azerbaijan, Armenia, and Turkey.

References

Darevskia
Reptiles described in 1834
Taxa named by Eduard Friedrich Eversmann
Reptiles of Russia